Schwab may refer to:

 Albert E. Schwab (1920–1945), United States Marine killed in action at Okinawa, 1945; awarded Medal of Honor
 Alexander Schwab (1887–1943), German politician-activist and commentator-journalist who died while imprisoned by the Nazis
 Andreas Schwab (born 1973), German politician
 Andrew Schwab, lead vocalist for the rock group Project 86
 Arthur J. Schwab (born 1946), United States federal judge
 Arthur Tell Schwab (1896–1945), Swiss athlete
 Carlos Schwabe (1877–1926), Swiss-German painter
 Charles M. Schwab (1862–1939), American industrialist
 Charles R. Schwab (born 1937), founder of the Charles Schwab Corporation
 Christoph Schwab (born 1962), German mathematician
 Corey Schwab, Canadian ice hockey player
 Fritz Schwab (1919–2006), Swiss athlete
 George D. Schwab (born 1931) Latvia born American historian 
 Gustav Schwab (1792–1850), German writer
 Howie Schwab, sports statistician
 Hubert Schwab (born 1982), Swiss racing cyclist
 Ivan R. Schwab, ophthalmologist, 2006 Ig Nobel prize winner
 John Schwab (born 1972), American actor, voice actor, producer and musician
 Keith Schwab (born 1968), American quantum physicist
 Klaus Schwab (born 1938), German economist, founder of the World Economic Forum
 Les Schwab (1917–2007), founder of Les Schwab Tire Centers
 Mark Dean Schwab (1968–2008), executed American murderer
 Matthias Schwab (pharmacologist) (born 1963), German Clinical Pharmacologist
 Michael Schwab, German anarchist convicted of the Haymarket bombings in Chicago
 Michael Schwab (designer) (born 1952), American graphic designer and illustrator
 Moïse Schwab (1839–1918), French librarian and author
 Scott Schwab (born 1972), American politician
 Shimon Schwab (1908–1993), German-born Orthodox rabbi
 Sigi Schwab (born 1940), German guitarist and composer
 Susan Schwab, United States Trade Representative
 V. E. Schwab (born 1987), American author
 Werner Schwab (1958–1994), Austrian writer

See also 
 Schwabe, surname
 Šváb

German-language surnames
Ethnonymic surnames